Lithocarpus ferrugineus is a tree in the beech family Fagaceae. The specific epithet  is from the Latin meaning "red-brown", referring to the acorn's indumentum.

Description
The greyish brown bark is smooth or scaly or lenticellate.

Distribution and habitat
Lithocarpus ferrugineus grows naturally in Peninsular Malaysia and Borneo. Its habitat is mixed dipterocarp to lower montane forests to  altitude.

References

ferrugineus
Trees of Peninsular Malaysia
Trees of Borneo
Plants described in 1970